Tovo di Sant'Agata is a comune (municipality) in the Province of Sondrio in the Italian region Lombardy, located about  northeast of Milan and about  northeast of Sondrio.

Tovo di Sant'Agata borders the following municipalities: Edolo, Lovero, Mazzo di Valtellina, Monno, Vervio.

Demographic evolution

References

Cities and towns in Lombardy